The Australian Lacrosse League (ALL) was an elite-level men's lacrosse competition that ran from 2004 to 2007 with the aim of boosting the profile and participation of the sport in Australia. The ALL replaced the Australian Senior Lacrosse Championships, which was held annually during a week-long carnival. Due to the unpopularity among some groups toward the format of the competition, from 2008 the national championship is again been contested as a carnival at a single venue.

The three strongest lacrosse-playing states of Victoria, South Australia and Western Australia competed in the ALL. The long-term goal of the league was to include a team from every Australian state.

Teams played each other twice, with double-headers (a Saturday and Sunday game) played over three weekends. Each state hosted one double-header and travelled for the other. The two teams with the best win–loss record over the round-robin tournament progressed to the final, played on the weekend following the last round-robin match.

ALL Champions 
 2004 - Victoria
 2005 - Victoria
 2006 - Western Australia
 2007 - Victoria

ALL Results 
Australian Lacrosse League 2004 season
Australian Lacrosse League 2005 season
Australian Lacrosse League 2006 season
Australian Lacrosse League 2007 season

See also

Lacrosse in Australia
List of Australian Lacrosse national champions

References

External links 
 Australian Lacrosse League
 Lacrosse Australia
 Lacrosse South Australia
 Lacrosse Victoria
 Western Australian Lacrosse Association

 
Lacrosse in Australia
2004 establishments in Australia
2007 disestablishments in Australia
Sports leagues established in 2004
Sports leagues disestablished in 2007